UPMC Cooper Fieldhouse, originally known as A.J. Palumbo Center, is a 3,500-seat multi-purpose arena in the Uptown area of Pittsburgh, Pennsylvania served by exits on both Interstate 376 and Interstate 579. The arena originally opened in 1988, and is part of Duquesne University. It is home to both the Duquesne Dukes basketball and volleyball programs.

History
The facility was originally known as the A.J. Palumbo Center. It was named in honor of its benefactor, Antonio J. Palumbo, who was elected to the Duquesne University board of directors and, in 1987, received an honorary doctorate of Business and Administration from Duquesne.

Early renovations
In 2006, the Palumbo Center underwent major renovations. In addition to resurfacing the basketball court, upgrading video monitors, and replacing some seating sections, the facility was updated and renovated to include:
New men's and women's basketball staff offices
Recruiting suite
Video breakdown room
Strength and conditioning facilities
Athletic trainer facilities
The center housed the administrative offices for the athletic department and facility management. The center was also open to intramural sports and other recreation groups; however, in 2007, Duquesne University completed a new five-story recreational facility on Forbes Ave. near the A.J. Palumbo Center, which was-then the primary facility for recreational sports and activities.

After the 2009-2010 basketball season, Duquesne University began further renovations on the Palumbo Center. A new center-hung scoreboard was installed as well as new corner scoreboards. In addition, then-current bleacher seating on the north end of the arena was replaced with permanent stadium chairs. The University also received $1.8 million in private donations to upgrade the locker rooms for the men's and women's basketball teams and the volleyball team. It was called the James and Janice Schaming Athletic Center, named after the largest donor.

UPMC Cooper Fieldhouse Renovation
The most extensive renovation began immediately after the 2018–19 basketball season. The project was completed at the start of the 2020–21 school year and the arena was renamed the UPMC Cooper Fieldhouse. The new name stems from a partnership between the University of Pittsburgh Medical Center and the family foundation of late Duquesne star Chuck Cooper, the Naismith Memorial Basketball Hall of Famer and the first African American selected in an NBA draft. Renovations include new seating, enhanced concession areas, two high-definition video boards, and a new scorer's table and sound system. The facility also houses the Folino Sports Performance Center featuring nearly 10,000 square feet of training equipment, sports performance labs, a nutrition center for all student-athletes, and the Joe and Kathy Guyaux Player Development Center which includes two regulation practice basketball courts. The original Palumbo name was transferred to the main entrance and atrium area of the renovated facility. 

During the renovations, the Dukes split home games between the UPMC Events Center at Robert Morris University, PPG Paints Arena, and the Kerr Fitness Center at La Roche University. The first game played in the renovated UPMC Cooper Fieldhouse was a 69–64 victory over Dayton.

Sports
Prior to the building of the facility, the men's basketball team played games at various sites around the city, including Pittsburgh Civic Arena (their exclusive home from 1964 to 1988, and used for occasional big games until 2009), Fitzgerald Field House, and Duquesne Gardens, as well as several high school gymnasiums.  The first men's basketball game was played in the arena on December 3, 1988, in which Duquesne defeated St. Joseph's 73–69.  As of January 2008, Duquesne men's basketball had 132-125 (.514) all-time record at the Palumbo Center. The facility is used for most major sports at Duquesne, and has played host to NIT games, WNIT games, high school post season championships, national wrestling championships, and Atlantic 10 tournament competitions. During the 1994-95 basketball season, the Palumbo Center was the home of the Continental Basketball Association's Pittsburgh Piranhas. In the team's lone season in Pittsburgh, the Piranhas lost to the Yakima Sun Kings in the 1995 CBA finals.  The new Consol Energy Center, now known as PPG Paints Arena, is now the home to the annual Pitt Panthers-Duquesne Dukes City Game as well as basketball games of regional interest, such as a men's game played on December 12, 2010 between the West Virginia Mountaineers and Duquesne.

UPMC Cooper Fieldhouse is also home to the women's volleyball team and hosted the Atlantic 10 Championship in 2012, won by Temple.

For their 2017–18 season and part of the 2018–19 season, the arena served as the home of the Robert Morris Colonials men's basketball team for four games while renovations to the UPMC Events Center were taking place.

See also
 List of NCAA Division I basketball arenas

References

External links

Duquesne University Athletics
Duquesne University

Duquesne Dukes men's basketball
College basketball venues in the United States
Basketball venues in Pittsburgh
Music venues in Pittsburgh
Sports venues completed in 1988
Event venues established in 1988
Music venues in Pennsylvania
1988 establishments in Pennsylvania
Continental Basketball Association venues